Apantesis yavapai is a moth of the subfamily Arctiinae. It was described by Schmidt in 2009. It is only found in the San Francisco
volcanic field in Coconino County, Arizona.

The length of the forewings is 14.4 mm. The ground colour of the forewings is chocolate brown. The hindwings are pinkish-yellow to dull yellow with dark brown markings. Adults have been recorded on wing from late June to early July.

This species was formerly a member of the genus Grammia, but was moved to Apantesis along with the other species of the genera Grammia, Holarctia, and Notarctia.

Etymology
The species is named after the indigenous tribe of central Arizona.

References

 Natural History Museum Lepidoptera generic names catalog

Arctiina
Moths described in 2009